Anina is a Romanian city.

Anina may also refer to:

People 

Anina (model), an American-born fashion model
Anina (singer) (born 1985), a Norwegian singer and songwriter
Anina Burger (born 1967), a South African cricketer
Anina Pinter, Los Angeles-based costume designer

Other 

Anina (film), a 2013 Uruguayan–Colombian animated film
Gârliște River (Caraș), a Romanian river
Anina Mine, a coal mine in Romania
Anina-Doman oil field, a shale oil field in Romania
Crivina Power Station, a thermal power plant in Romania